The 1968 West Virginia Mountaineers football team represented West Virginia University in the 1968 NCAA University Division football season. It was the Mountaineers' 76th overall season and they competed as an independent. The team was led by head coach Jim Carlen, in his third year, and played their home games at Mountaineer Field in Morgantown, West Virginia. They finished the season with a record of 7–3.

Schedule

Reference:

References

West Virginia
West Virginia Mountaineers football seasons
West Virginia Mountaineers football